Doris Mary Cannell (19 July 1913 – 18 April 2000) was an English educator and historian of early 19th century mathematical physics, in particular of George Green.

Early life
Cannell was educated in Liverpool, with a scholarship to the selective private Merchant Taylors' School for Girls followed by BA from University of Liverpool in French with History subsidiary. She then gained a Postgraduate Diploma in Education and held teaching posts in the UK and France.

Career
During World War II she lectured to troops and this changed the direction of her career into higher education and the training of teachers. In 1960 she was appointed the deputy principal of the new Nottingham College of Education.  In 1974, as acting principal, she led the formation of what became Nottingham Trent University, bringing together her college, Trent Polytechnic and other educational institutions in Nottingham.

Research
After her retirement in the 1970s, she again changed direction to become a respected historian of mathematics. Her major achievement was rediscovering the importance of George Green in the development of nineteenth century applied physics. He had initially worked as a miller near Nottingham and although his mathematical discoveries were known and used worldwide, very little was known about his life.  Her major biography of him brought his work, life and legacy together for the first time, introducing him as an important influence in nineteenth century applied physics. Cannell and colleagues at Nottingham led the recovery of his legacy, completing the restoration of his windmill in time for his bicentenary in 1993.

Legacy
The Mary Cannell Summer Studentships in mathematics at the University of Nottingham, funded from a legacy she made, commemorate her.

Selected publications
 D. M. Cannell, "George Green: an enigmatic mathematician", 1999) American Mathematical Monthly, 106, 136–51
 D.M. Cannel and N.J. Lord, "George Green: Mathematician and Physicist", (1993) The Mathematical Gazette vol. 77, (478), 26-51.

References

External links

1913 births
2000 deaths
Schoolteachers from Merseyside
Academics of Nottingham Trent University
Alumni of the University of Liverpool